Nicole Burnham is the author of several romance novels and books for teens. She writes romances under the name Nicole Burnham and young adult novels under the name Niki Burnham.

Biography
Nicole Burnham is originally from Colorado, but was born in Key West, Florida, while her father was briefly stationed there with the military. She graduated from Mannheim American High School in 1988, then obtained her B.A. in political science magna cum laude in 1991 from Colorado State University, where she was Phi Beta Kappa. She earned both an M.A. in political science from the University of Michigan and a J.D. from the University of Michigan Law School in 1994. She clerked for a federal magistrate in Colorado and practiced law in St. Louis, Missouri before turning to writing full-time.

Burnham was a double finalist for the Romance Writers of America's Golden Heart in 2000. One of those two finalist manuscripts was Going to the Castle, which went on to become her first published novel the following year. She won the 2004 RITA in the Best Short Contemporary Series category for The Knight's Kiss, her third published novel. She was a RITA finalist again in 2005 for The Bowen Bride and in 2015 for Slow Tango With a Prince.

Burnham served on the board of directors of the Romance Writers of America for four years.

Burnham currently resides in Boston, Massachusetts. She is an avid baseball fan and maintains a blog called The Go-Ahead in which she discusses writing, health, and her favorite baseball teams, the Boston Red Sox and the Colorado Rockies. She appeared on Jeopardy! in July 2000, losing to eventual Jeopardy! Tournament of Champions runner-up Tad Carithers.

List of works

Romance novels - Nicole Burnham

The Royal Scandals series
 Christmas With a Prince (prequel novella) - November 2013
 Scandal With a Prince  - November 2013
 Honeymoon With a Prince - December 2013
 Christmas on the Royal Yacht (novella) - October 2014
 Slow Tango With a Prince - June 2014
 The Royal Bastard  - June 2015
 Christmas With a Palace Thief (novella) - October 2015
 A Royal Scandals Wedding (novella) - August 2016
 The Wicked Prince - August 2016
 One Man's Princess - October 2017

These romances follow the Barrali royal family of the fictional island nation of Sarcaccia.  The books are set in various locations around the world.

Three Royal Scandals Christmas novellas (Christmas With a Prince, Christmas on the Royal Yacht, and Christmas With a Palace Thief) were also released in a single collection titled A Royal Scandals Christmas.

The Royal Scandals: San Rimini series
 The Hire (prequel novella) - February 2020
 Fit for a Queen - February 2020
 Going to the Castle - March 2020
 The Prince's Tutor - April 2020
 The Knight's Kiss - May 2020
 Falling for Prince Federico - June 2020
 To Kiss a King - July 2020

These romances follow the diTalora royal family of the fictional Mediterranean country of San Rimini.

Royal Scandals: San Rimini Books 2 - 5 (Going to the Castle, The Prince's Tutor, The Knight's Kiss, and Falling For Prince Federico) were originally released in a shorter format by Silhouette Books (2001-2004).

The Bowen, Nebraska series
 The Bowen Bride - November 2018

The Bowen Bride was originally released in a shorter format by Silhouette Books (2004).

Other romance fiction
 One Bachelor to Go (Silhouette Romance) - February 2004

Young adult novels - Niki Burnham

The Valerie Winslow series

 Royally Jacked - Simon Pulse (UK title:  Royally Crushed ) - 2004
 Spin Control - Simon Pulse - 2005
 Do-Over - Simon Pulse - 2006
 Reality Check (short story) - 2006

This series of romantic comedies centers on high school sophomore Valerie Winslow, whose parents are getting a divorce. Her father is offered a job with the royal family in the fictional European country of Schwerinborg. Valerie opts to go along, where she ends up falling for the royal family's teenage son, Prince Georg.

Anthologies
 "Night Swimming" in Fireworks:  Four Summer Stories with Erin Haft, Sarah Mlynowski, and Lauren Myracle (Scholastic Point) - April 2007
 "Last Stand" in Breaking Up (Is Hard To Do) with Terri Clark, Ellen Hopkins, and Lynda Sandoval (Houghton Mifflin Graphia) - May 2008

Other young adult fiction
 Sticky Fingers - Simon Pulse - 2005
 Scary Beautiful — Simon Pulse -2006
 Goddess Games — Simon & Schuster Books for Young Readers - 2007
 Shot Through the Heart - 2011

Honors and awards
  2004 RITA Award Winner - Best Short Contemporary Series romance for The Knight's Kiss 
  2005 RITA Award Finalist- Best Traditional Series romance for The Bowen Bride
  2015 RITA Award Finalist - Best Contemporary: Long romance for Slow Tango With a Prince 
  American Library Association Quick Pick for Reluctant Young Readers for Royally Jacked 
  New York Public Library's 2005 Books for the Teen Age for Royally Jacked 
  Teen People  Pick for Royally Jacked

References

See also

 official Nicole Burnham website
 A Home Run First Time at Bat? - All About Romance Interview

21st-century American novelists
American romantic fiction writers
21st-century American women writers
Living people
Novelists from Colorado
Colorado State University alumni
University of Michigan Law School alumni
American women novelists
American young adult novelists
Women romantic fiction writers
Women writers of young adult literature
Year of birth missing (living people)